Lugalanda, also Lugal-anda was a Sumerian king of Lagash during the 24th century BC.

Lugalanda was the son of the high priest of Lagash, who appointed him as king.  At this time the high priests of Lagash were very influential, and either occupied the throne, or decided who should. The priests, especially the high priests, remained very influential during Lugalanda's reign.

Lugalanda was married to Baranamtarra, the daughter of a great landowner who had commercial connections with the queen of Adab.

All documents mentioning the reign of Lugalanda describe him as a wealthy and corrupt king. They say his reign was a time of great corruption and injustice against the weak. Inscriptions state that the king confiscated approximately 650 Morgen (up to 650 hectares) of land.

After a reign of 6 years and 1 month, Lugalanda was overthrown by Urukagina.

References

Sources 
 The original text comes from German Wikipedia. It cites Helmut Uhlig: Die Sumerer. Lübbe, Bergisch-Gladbach 1992, S. 208 ff., 211. . (German)

Kings of Lagash
24th-century BC Sumerian kings